Jean-Michel Soupraya (born April 25, 1973), is a French record producer, music conductor, musical arranger, film composer, artist development expert. and musician. Often referred to as The Next Quincy Jones, Soupraya is noted for his talent at piano and keyboard and unique eclectic musical abilities. He has been heavily influenced by his time spent in the West Indies where he was surrounded by percussion, marimbas, singers, dancers and carnivals. He was a keyboardist for Zionbar, an international reggae band Polygram and Universal; and collaborated with Guy Nsangue, Abraham Laboriel, Paul Jackson Jr., John JR Robinson, Luis Conte, Franck Gelibert, Lenny Waronker, Phil Tan, Mick Guzauski of Barking Doctor Recording, Henri Gravier, Luck Mervil, Malcolm Pollack, Dave Aron, Curtis King, popular French rappers Tonton David and MC Solaar. In 2014, he created the TV show "The Producer Show".

Biography

Early life
During his youth, Soupraya was a dedicated soccer player. But at the age of twelve he sustained a paralyzing injury that nearly disabled him permanently. Jean-Michel had to be sent to a special children's hospital in Paris where his mother introduced him to music by bringing him keyboards, believing in the power of music to heal him. During this two-year convalescence, Jean-Michel became a self-taught master of the keyboard and walked out of the hospital despite a grim initial prognosis.

In his early teens, Soupraya attended boarding school in Le Mans, France where his popularity grew with self-inspired concerts. Discovering another passion, Soupraya also taught himself how to read, write, and compose music.

Musical career

Soupraya spent five years under contract at television channel France 2, composing music for several popular television shows. In addition to composing popular music, he has created music for film, stage, orchestras, and video games. A song he composed called "Tenderness" (sung in French) made it to the Eurovision 2000 competition finals. Soupraya then began working internationally, between London, Paris, New York, and Montreal, as he worked to debut his first multi-cultural album, "L'enfant du monde."  The album, produced in Montreal, united musicians from four countries.

Soupraya began work with a French singer Jenny Zana, seventeen at the time, in 1998.  The large scale production of the song "Tenderness" performed by Zana in the Eurovision competition (2000).

In 2000, Jean-Michel discovered and partnered with Sofie Mazeyrat, a Parisian-born singer of Italian descent, who gained recognition and an international following, singing in English, French, Italian and Spanish. After Sophie appeared in the Eurovision television contest at L'Olympia, the largest concert hall in Paris, Soupraya produced her debut album "I Can Do It".

Soupraya moved to Los Angeles in 2004, where he founded JMWest Records USA (2004), and produced the Lea Jones album, "Lucky Boy" which was critically received encouragingly well.

Soupraya created JMWest Entertainment label (www.jmwestentertainment.com) in 2006, devoting himself to the development and production of multiple artists. Including, pop recording artist Citlalii, (2009), Kazakhstan-born alternative pop recording artist and songwriter RuZANNA, (2010), female pop recording artist JUSTICE (Lauren Justice – www.JUSTICEmusicDaily.com),(2011), R&B/Pop recording artist/songwriter Kylie Marcus (2013), and Finn (2013).

Soupraya produced and co-wrote for JMWest Entertainment "Find A Way" by JUSTICE, the pop artist's Top 40 (#30 TOP 40 Billboard Indicator) debut single (March 2012).  Soupraya also produced "Will You Be There (Kazakh Version)" by RuZANNA which released on music television in Kazakhstan (September 2012). In March 2013, JUSTICE's second single "By My Side" was released – also produced and co-written by Soupraya. In November 2013, "Yellow Shirt" by Kylie Marcus (co-written/produced by Soupraya) released.

Soupraya settled in Beverly Hills, where he currently resides and operates JMWest Entertainment Group, LLC and JMWest LIVE!.

In 2014 the single "Yellow shirt" by Kylie Marcus reached number 4 in Billboard single chart. In 2017, the first single by CARMA "The Recipe" reached number 7 in Billboard single chart.

Social Activism
In 2005 Jean-Michel Soupraya produced the new CD single "HOPE" for JMWest Records, performed by Lea Jones with Abraham Laboriel, Luis Conte, Tom Walsh, Franck Gelibert, JD Daniel, Dave Aron and others. Title song lyrics were by Solomon J. LeFlore, for the documentary produced by Solomon J. LeFlore and Susan Gee to benefit the Mary Ellen Gerber (M.E.G.) Foundation about the devastating 1999 Orissa, India cyclone and the 2004 Indonesian tsunami and the foundation started by Mary Ellen Gerber to "nurture children in need."

Frequently applauded for his unique ability to recruit top talent Soupraya began JMWest LIVE! in 2010. JMWest LIVE!'s altruistic effort to provide up and coming artist (musicians, singers, songwriters, AND production team) with an affordable forum with which to introduce themselves to the industry has hosted events at venues throughout Los Angeles including the Roxy, VIP Lounge and The House of Blues, Foundation Room.

Discography

Filmography

Timeline 
1997
Jean-Michel Soupraya creates
JMWest Records

1998
Joint Venture with the Canadian Label "Black Light Production"

1999
First Realization of "Children of the World" with Canadian and French Artists

2000
Eurovision contest. Jenny Zana with Sofie Mazeyrat

2001
Production agreement with Patrick Geindre to develop and internationalize the company and the artists

2002
Realization of the album "Desire" for Lea Jones in New York

2004
Creation of JMWest Records USA.

2004
Joint Venture with Solomon J. LeFlore

2005
Development of what would later become the JMWest Entertainment Duplication Division

2005
Realization of the song "HOPE" with Lea Jones, Abraham Laboriel for the Katrina victims through MEG Foundation.

2005
Produced and composed music for "Mothering Children in Need", a documentary produced by Vision Quest Entertainment – Burbank CA for the Mary Ellen Gerber Foundation.

2006
Creation of JMWest Entertainment LLC.

2006
Arrangements, compositions, songwriting, CD/DVD Duplication

2007
Development & creation of JMWest Entertainment Duplication Division www.jmwestentertainment.com

2007
Creation of Lea Jones' New album LUCKY BOY

2008
Development of Music Library to over 400 songs.

2009
Development of Music Library to over 500 songs.

2009
Entered development contract with Citlalii

2010
Creation of JMWest LIVE!

2010
Signed pop artist Citlalii.

2010
Signed Artist RuZANNA.

2010
Entered development contract with Stephanie Quartararo

2011
Signed artist JUSTICE

2011
Development of Music Library to over 600 songs

2012
US release of TOP 40 single (#30 TOP 40 Billboard Indicator) "Find A Way" by JUSTICE

2012
Kazakhstan release of Music Video for "Will You Be There" (Kazakh Version) by RuZANNA.

2013
Release of TOP 40 radio single "By My Side" by JUSTICE

2013
Signed recording artist Kylie Marcus

2013
Signed recording artist Finn

2013
Release of single "Yellow Shirt" by Kylie Marcus

2014 
Release of single "You Don't Know How To Love" by RuZanna

2014
Release of single "Lover" by Finn

2014
Release of EP "No Disguise" by Kylie Marcus

2017
Release of single "The Recipe" by Carma

References

External links 

JM West LIVE!
JM West Entertainment
Trans Europe Xpress
Fear of a Rap Planet
Renascence Music
HOPE is for all children

1973 births
Living people
African-American songwriters
French jazz composers
Male jazz composers
American dance musicians
American film score composers
American male film score composers
French music arrangers
American record producers
American male songwriters
American jazz composers
American male jazz composers
21st-century French male pianists
21st-century American male musicians
21st-century African-American musicians